The 2007 Davao City general election was held on May 14, 2007.

For Davao City Hall Seats

Administration coalition

Opposition/independent coalition

Official Votes

FOR CONGRESSMAN

Notes

Politics of Davao City
Elections in Davao del Sur
2007 Philippine local elections